Andrian is a comune (municipality) in South Tyrol in northern Italy, located about  north-west of the city of Bolzano.

Geography

Andrian borders the following municipalities: Eppan, Nals and Terlan.

History

Coat-of-arms
The emblem is that of the Lords of Andrian. It's party per pale of gules and argent with a pile curved inward and the colours alternating. The emblem was adopted in 1968.

Society

Linguistic distribution
According to the 2011 census, 89.96% of the population speak German, 9.53% Italian and 0.51% Ladin as first language.

Demographic evolution

References

External links

 Homepage of the municipality
 Tourism info

Municipalities of South Tyrol
Articles which contain graphical timelines